Kenneth Crotty (born 23 October 1938) is an Australian diver. He competed in the men's 3 metre springboard event at the 1960 Summer Olympics.

References

External links
 
 

1938 births
Living people
Australian male divers
Olympic divers of Australia
Divers at the 1960 Summer Olympics
Divers from Melbourne
20th-century Australian people
21st-century Australian people
People from Essendon, Victoria